The Hobbit is a 1968 BBC Radio adaptation of J. R. R. Tolkien's 1937 children's fantasy novel of the same name.

The series was adapted by Michael Kilgarriff and produced by John Powell in eight half-hour mono episodes for BBC Radio 4 broadcast from September 29 to November 17 at 8.30pm.

Story

The radio series follows the plot of the original novel (revised 1951 version) very closely, except for the addition of The Tale Bearer, a narrator whose account of the story is often interrupted and embellished by the protagonist Bilbo Baggins in the role of secondary narrator.

Bilbo is approached by the wizard Gandalf to undertake a dangerous adventure, and despite his initial reluctance he soon finds himself accompanying Thorin Oakenshield and his party of dwarves on a long and difficult quest to recover the dwarves' treasure from Smaug the dragon. On the way, he encounters trolls, goblins and giant spiders, and finds a magic ring with the power of invisibility.

Production
The show's production was complicated by the inclusion of multiple sound effects (often inserted live while recording the actors' performances), songs from the novel, and special sounds and electronic voice treatments created by the BBC Radiophonic Workshop. All of the trolls, goblins, Elves, Wargs and Eagles have treated voices, as does Gandalf when imitating the trolls.

Influences from The Lord of the Rings
Although the script is closely based on the original novel, Kilgariff incorporates a few names and phrases from The Lord of the Rings that did not originally appear in The Hobbit.
In an early scene at Bag End, Gandalf originally tells Bilbo, "Great elephants, you're not at all yourself today". In the radio version this is changed to "Great oliphaunts", the form used in The Lord of the Rings.
At the beginning of the Battle of Five Armies Gandalf says, "Upon victory depends not just the treasure, nor only our lives, but the whole future and well-being of Middle-earth". The name Middle-earth is not used at all in the original novel. Indeed, Tolkien had not written The Hobbit as taking place in Middle-earth, as he had been writing The Silmarillion for some time, and wrote The Hobbit separately.
During the battle, the Elvenking says his name, Thranduil, as a battle-cry.
In the same battle Thorin utters the Dwarves' battle-cry, "Baruk Khazâd! Khazâd aimênu!"
Near the end, when Balin and Gandalf are visiting Bilbo, Balin tells Gandalf that Bilbo seems to be writing his memoirs, to which Gandalf replies, "Well he'll never get a publisher".

The script retains almost all of the book's differences and inconsistencies from Tolkien's other works.

Wiping and recovery
The original master tapes for the series seem to have been wiped in the 1970s. The reason is not clear, although it was rumoured to be due to a dispute with the Tolkien estate (if so, the subsequent recovery and commercial issue of the series would suggest that the dispute was resolved).

The BBC eventually recovered the series from a domestic off-air FM recording, apparently comprising 90- and 60-minute compilations edited together from the original episodes. The sound quality of these recordings is clear and legible, though it is noticeably inferior to a studio-quality recording and exhibits prominent tape hiss.

For broadcast and home audio purposes the BBC re-edited these compilations back into half-hour episodes, adding a brief snatch of the theme tune at the beginning and end of each. The title The Hobbit is spoken only at the beginning of the first episode and there are no opening or closing credits.

Audio release and reference
There have been several home audio releases of the series on cassette and CD. The 1997 CD release includes a bonus CD containing 9¼ minutes of additional music in stereo, which was taken from BBC records REC 91S [LP] David Munrow and the Early Music Consort of London play music by David Cain recorded in 1971. The tracks include:

Opening and Bilbo's Theme (1:58)
Elves' Dances (1:38)
Bilbo's Lullaby (2:10)
Fanfare and Dance in Esgaroth (3:31)

The 1997 set also contains a "Personal Memoir" by series producer John Powell, from which some of the information in this article is derived.

Cast and credits

Main cast
 Anthony Jackson – The Tale Bearer
 Paul Daneman – Bilbo
 Francis de Wolff – Smaug
 John Justin – Thorin
 Heron Carvic – Gandalf
 Leonard Fenton – Elvenking
 John Pullen – Elrond
 Wolfe Morris – Gollum
 Duncan McIntyre – Bombur
 Lockwood West – Dwalin
 Peter Pratt – Balin
 Alexander John – Dori
 Peter Williams – Bard the Bowman
 Denis McCarthy – Great Goblin

Additional voices
 Peter Baldwin – Galion, Glóin
 David Brierly – Fíli
 John Bryning – Master of Laketown
 Wilfred Carter – Ori
 Nicholas Edmett – Kíli
 Greta Gouriet – Spider
 Brian Haines – Bert, Bifur, Dáin II Ironfoot
 Betty Hardy – Spider
 Denys Hawthorne – Beorn
 Hayden Jones – Elf Guard, Elves, Goblins
 Hilda Kriseman – Spider
 Rolf Lefebvre – Óin
 Victor Lucas – Bill
 Denis McCarthy – Bofur, Great Goblin
 Ian Thompson – Herald of Laketown
 Anthony Viccars – Nori
 Marjorie Westbury – Thrush
 John Wyse – Roäc

Crew
 Music composed by David CainPerformed by David Munrow with The Early Music Consort
 Special sound effects and voice treatments by David Cain and Dick Mills, BBC Radiophonic Workshop
 Produced by John Powell

References

Radio programmes based on Middle-earth
BBC Radio 4 programmes
Fantasy radio programs
Works based on The Hobbit
Works about dragons